Peachy Harrison (1777–1848) was a nineteenth-century physician and American politician who served in both houses of the Virginia General Assembly, and was a delegate to the Virginia Constitutional Convention. He also served as Rockingham County Sheriff.

Early life
Harrison was born in Rockingham County, the son of Colonel Benjamin Harrison of Augusta County, his father's plantation was at present Dayton, Virginia, and Peachy attended Fisher's Spring School. He completed his education graduating from the medical school conducted by Dr. Benjamin Rush in Philadelphia.

Career

As an adult, Harrison lived and practiced medicine in Harrisonburg. He was elected Sheriff of Rockingham County 1824–1826, and then served in the Virginia House of Delegates. By the time he was elected as a Virginia State Senator, he had become his party's leader in the Rockingham County region of the Valley. 
 
Harrison was elected as a delegate to the Virginia Constitutional Convention of 1829–1830. There he was elected by the Convention to serve on the Judicial Committee. He was one of four delegates elected from the senatorial district made up of Shenandoah and Rockingham Counties.

Death
Peachy Harrison died in the spring of 1848 at Harrisonburg, Virginia.

Harrison's children included the classicist and University of Virginia professor Gessner Harrison.

References

Bibliography

Members of the Virginia House of Delegates
1777 births
1848 deaths
Virginia state senators
People from Rockingham County, Virginia
Virginia sheriffs
Physicians from Virginia
19th-century American physicians
19th-century American politicians
People from Harrisonburg, Virginia
Harrison family of Virginia